Fei Mu (October 10, 1906 — January 31, 1951), also romanised as Fey Mou, was a Chinese film director of the pre-Communist era. His Spring in a Small Town (1948) was declared the greatest Chinese film ever made by the Hong Kong Film Critics Society.

Biography
Fei Mu's ancestral hometown is Suzhou, Jiangsu Province. He was born in Shanghai, China in 1906. Before becoming a director, he worked as an assistant of the film pioneer Hou Yao.

Known for his artistic style and costume dramas, Fei made his first film, Night in the City (1933), produced by the Lianhua Film Company), at the age of 27, and he was met with both critical and popular acclaim; the film is now lost. Continuing to make films with Lianhua, Fei directed films throughout the 1930s and became a major talent in the industry, with films like Blood on Wolf Mountain (1936) which is often seen as an allegory on the war with Japan, and Song of China (1935), a glorification of traditional values that was part of the New Life Movement. Later, Song of China became one of the few films that had a limited release in the United States.

Fei's legacy as one of China's greatest directors was sealed with Spring in a Small Town (1948) about a love triangle in post-war China (it was later remade by Tian Zhuangzhuang in 2002 as Springtime in a Small Town). Director Wong Kar-wai called him the only film poet he knew in China. In 2005, Spring in a Small Town was declared the greatest Chinese film ever made by the Hong Kong Film Critics Society. Fei remained active in this so-called "Second Golden Age" and also directed China's first color film A Wedding in the Dream (1948), which incorporated Beijing Opera and starred Mei Lanfang. Following the Communist revolution in 1949, Fei Mu, along with many other artists and intellectuals fled to Hong Kong. There he founded Longma Film Company (Dragon-Horse Films) with Zhu Shilin and Fei Luyi and produced (under the Longma name) Zhu Shilin's The Flower Girl (1951).

Following his death from a heart attack in Hong Kong in 1951 while working at his desk, Fei Mu and his work temporarily fell into obscurity, as much of his filmography was forgotten or ignored on the mainland and rejected by leftists as indicative of rightist ideologies. It was not until the 1980s, when the China Film Archive re-opened after being closed down during the Cultural Revolution, that Fei Mu's work found a new audience. Most significant was a new print made by the China Film Archive from the original negative of Spring in a Small Town.

Filmography

Director

Screenwriter

Producer

Further reading

See also
 Lianhua Film Company

Notes

External links 
 Chinese Film Classics: Fei Mu: The scholarly website chinesefilmclassics.org contains information about Fei and English-subtitled versions of Song of China and Spring in a Small Town (course module)
 
Fei Mu at the Chinese Movie Database
A brief biography of Fei Mu
A biographical article on Fei Mu and the making of Spring in a Small Town 
Fei Mu Documents, Suzhou Art Museum, 2018.10.20-2018.11.25 “诗人导演”费穆文献展亮相苏州美术馆

1906 births
1951 deaths
Film directors from Shanghai
Screenwriters from Shanghai
Chinese Civil War refugees
Chinese silent film directors
20th-century screenwriters
Chinese emigrants to British Hong Kong